List of World War I memorials and cemeteries in the area of the Saint-Mihiel salient, in the present day Meuse department of the Lorraine region, located in northeastern France.

In this region the monuments and cemeteries are divided into: those linked to the efforts of the French to regain the ridge at Les Éparges, from 1915 to 1918; and those linked to the American offensive of the St Mihiel salient, the Battle of St Mihiel in September 1918.

War Memorials and Cemeteries: Saint-Mihiel and the area of the St Mihiel salient

After the Battle of the Marne and on 13 September 1914, the 5th German Army went into retreat and retrenched east of Verdun on the Woëvre plain and at the foot of the "Heights of the Meuse" (the Hauts de Meuse). From here they intended to relaunch their offensive and reach the Meuse river. From 20 September, the Germans attacked on a line from Étain to Pont-à-Mousson and in several days had effectively created a bulge in the French line reaching as far as Saint-Mihiel, where they were halted by General Taverna's 16th Army Corps. What was to be known as the "St Mihiel Salient" was formed.

Part of the area taken by the Germans was the ridge or "Crête" at Les Éparges. This ridge was of great strategic importance because of the views in gave over the Woëvre plain and the French knew that they would never be able to retake the plain without first taking Hauts de Meuse and in particular the ridge at Les Éparges .

In the 1914-1918 war, the ridge at Les Éparges at 346 meters high was to serve as a counterpoint to the Butte de Vauquois. Both these areas of high ground served as eastern and western ends to the Verdun sector of the Western Front. Both were fought over fiercely and both were the scene of intensive mine warfare after head to head encounters produced no noticeable break through for either side.

The Crête des Éparges and its memorials and monuments
The main French attempts to take the ridge were launched by General Joffre in 1915 and that year saw a series of French attacks, all fought with fierce intensity and resulting in much loss of life. The encounters embraced the Tranchée de Calonne, the woods of Chavalier and the wood at Brûlée. The ridge itself saw many bitter encounters and the terrain was soon changed for ever by the detonation of mines the digging of tunnels and constant artillery shelling.

From 5 to 14 April 1915, the 1st French Army under General Roques engaged the Germans on the ridge and the Woëvre plain but they were unable to take the ridge. At one point they advanced as far as "Point X", the furthest point east on the ridge and that giving the best views over the plain but they were soon forced back. The ridge was divided by the French into various areas gauged in their distance from the original French front line. Thus "Point A" was the nearest to the French trenches and "Point X" the furthest away. These attacks absorbed the attention of the entire French 1st Army and they lost the equivalent of an entire division – almost 18,000 men. It was no accident that Maurice Genevoix, the French novelist, was to call his narrative of the battle, "La Morte"- Death.

The trench fighting was not restricted to the Les Éparges ridge and south of St Mihiel there were encounters in the Ailly wood and that at Brûlée. Here the fighting involved General Bourges' 8th Army Corps.

Once the many encounters of 1915 had produced no major breakthrough for either side, the fighting on the surface was less intense and fighting moved underground and over the years of the war the ridge continued to be mined comprehensively from  Point C to Point X. Now the fighting was to go underground to an even greater extent, with a war of tunnels and mines and in this period, 46 German mines and 32 French mines were detonated but still without producing any change in the front line.

In 1916, the waging of the Battle of Verdun saw the French withdraw voluntarily from the Woëvre plain area from 22 to 26 February and the French took up their main defensive position around the Fort at Moulainville which was bombarded by the German 420mm guns.

There was no great change to the front line in 1917 and it was only when the Americans attacked on 12 September 1918 that the salient was to again hear the roar of the guns and be finally freed from German occupation.

Today one can see many reminders of these encounters in the ridge's terrain and there are several monuments and memorials to mark the contributions of those who fought here and this list will identify and describe some of them

Monument to the 106th French Regiment of Infantry

The Monument du Coq at Point C

Monument to the Engineers at Éparges

The Monument du Point X- Monument to the Missing

Memorial to the 302nd French Infantry
Just by the Monument at Point X there is a small memorial to the soldiers of the 302nd who died fighting here from 20 September 1914 to 21 March 1915. It also covers the actions of the 102nd. The inscription reads

Croix des Carmes

Cemeteries in the Éparges

Memorial to Alain Fornier and companions

The Fort at Troyon

Fort de Liouville

The Saint-Mihiel salient. The American Offensive of 1918 and the Monuments and Cemeteries linked to it
When the German armies launched their five great offensives of 1918, the Allies realised that the situation was perilous and that the arrival of the American troops was now crucial but when these troops began to reach France, General John. J. Pershing, the Commander-in-Chief of the American Expeditionary Forces, was reluctant to allow his men to be rushed into action and used piecemeal but wanted to concentrate on consolidation and acclimatisation and getting his men organised as an effective fighting units. He did however release to French control some of his troops when the German third and fifth offensives put the French Army under great pressure and these contributions and the efforts of the units involved are recorded at the Aisne-Marne American Cemetery and on the Chateau-Thierry Monument.

Once the success of the Second Battle of the Marne had seen the German Army retreating, the Allied Command were determined to keep the Germans on the back foot and several major offensives were planned at an Allied conference on 24 July. 1918. The British and French forces were allocated the sector around Amiens and the St Mihiel sector was allocated to the Americans. This salient projected roughly 16 miles into the Allied line and ran from Verdun in the north, south to St Mihiel and then east to Pont-a-Mousson on the Moselle River. The area was bordered by a line of hills known as the Heights of the Meuse and a succession of marshes and lakes situated across deep ravines and dense forests. The salient also protected the strategic rail centre of Metz and the Briey iron basin, a rich source for the Germans of raw material for munitions production. It also constituted an ongoing threat to Verdun and Nancy. It was essential that the salient be reduced before any larger offensive be launched against Metz or Briery or in the Argonne sector further north which had also been allocated to the Americans.

On 30 August,  the U.S.First Army was asked to limit its efforts to the reduction of the salient so that very soon after it could undertake the larger task presented in the Meuse/Argonne area.

The St. Mihiel offensive began on 12 September with a threefold assault on the salient. The main attack was made against the south face by two American corps. The First Corps was on the right(from right to left the 82nd, 90th, 5th, and 2nd Divisions in line with the 78th in reserve) and covered a front from Pont-à-Mousson on the Moselle,  westward to Limey, while on the left, the Fourth Corps (from right to left the 89th, 42nd, and 1st Divisions in line with the 3rd in reserve) extended along a front from Limey westward to Marvoisin. A secondary thrust was carried out against the west face of the salient along the Heights of the Meuse, from Mouilly north to Haudimont, by the Fifth Corps (from right to left the 26th Division, the French 15th Colonial Division, and the 8th Brigade, 4th Division in line with the rest of the 4th in reserve). A holding attack against the apex, to keep the enemy in the salient, was made by the French II Colonial Corps (from right to left the French 39th Colonial Division, the French 26th Division, and the French 2d Cavalry Division in line). In the First Army reserve were the American 35th, 80th, and 91st Divisions. The Allies also mobilized 1,481 aircraft to provide air superiority and close air support over the front.

Defending the salient was German "Army Detachment C", consisting of eight divisions and a brigade in the line and about two divisions in reserve. The Germans had begun a step-by-step withdrawal from the salient the day before.

By 16 September, the salient was eliminated and now the Americans would need to move their focus to the Meuse-Argonne.

The Montsec Monument

St Mihiel American Cemetery and Memorial

The Massachusetts Monument at Apremont-la-Forêt

Franco-American Monument at Flirey
In the village of Flirey is this monument celebrating the joint Franco-American action which took place in 1918.

Memorial to the 1631st Regiment of Infantry at Flirey

Literary associations

This area of the Western Front has many literary associations. These include:-
 Alain-Fournier served with the 288th Infantry and disappeared fighting in the Eparges. In 1991, his body was found in a communal German grave not far from the Tranchée de Calonne.
 Ernst Jünger the German writer fought while serving in the 76th at Éparges and was wounded. He describes his experience in Orages d'acier.
 Maurice Genevoix was an officer in the 7th company of the 106th Infantry which fought on the ridge at Éparges. He wrote of his experiences in 4 novels- Sous Verdun, Nuit de guerre, La Boue, Les Éparges. These were condensed into one book entitled Ceux de 14.

Gallery of Images

See also
List of World War I Memorials and Cemeteries in Lorraine
List of World War I Memorials and Cemeteries in Alsace
List of World War I memorials and cemeteries in the Argonne
List of World War I memorials and cemeteries in Artois
List of World War I memorials and cemeteries in Champagne-Ardennes
List of World War I memorials and cemeteries in Flanders
List of World War I memorials and cemeteries in the Somme
List of World War I memorials and cemeteries in Verdun

References

Saint Mihiel
Saint Mihiel
Buildings and structures in Meuse (department)
St Mihiel

St Mihiel salient
Tourist attractions in Meuse (department)
World War I in Saint Mihiel
Saint Mihiel
Memorials and Cemeteries in Saint Mihiel